Polina Pasztircsák (international spelling: Pastirchak) (born 24 September 1982 in Budapest) is a Hungarian operatic and concert singer (soprano).

Biography

Education and early career 
Pastirchak was born in Budapest as the second daughter of a Hungarian father and a Russian mother. Her parents are designers, as well as her sister, Larisza Pasztircsák is founder of the fashion label Mrs Herskin. Pastirchak began studying voice at the age of 19 with her first teacher, Julia Bikfalvy, in Budapest. In 2004, she won the Simandy National Singing Competition. She continued her musical studies in Italy as a pupil of Mirella Freni. In 2010, she completed her degree in Conservatorio Girolamo Frescobaldi in Ferrara. In addition to her musical studies, she attained a degree in Cultural Management at the West Hungarian University. She works on her repertoire with vocal coaches Carol Richardson-Smith and Jeffrey Smith, as well as on her Liedrepertoire with Jan Philip Schulze in Hannover. In 2007, she made her operatic debut in Modena in a contemporary opera by Lorenzo Ferrero, Le piccole storie. Here at Teatro Comunale Modena, in the next season, she sang with great success the role of Micaëla. Her international breakthrough came in 2009 when she won the first prize and all special prizes at the Geneva International Music Competition. In 2011, she sang Partenope at the Handel festival in Karlsruhe, in 2013 Woglinde in the new ring production of Grand Théâtre de Genève.

Artistic development 
Since 2011, Pastirchak is regularly guesting at the Hungarian State Operahouse with roles like Desdemona, Amelia, Nedda, Violetta, Melisande, Mimì, Micaëla, Donna Anna, Contessa. In 2014, she made an important debut as Strauss's Daphne conducted by Zoltán Kocsis. She returns every year at Ádám Fischer's Budapest Wagner Festival as Gutrune. In 2016, she sang Vespina in Cavalli's Veremonda at the Schwetzingen Festival, Mimì in St. Gallen. Later she sang Traviata at the Capitole de Toulouse, Humperdinck's Königskinder and Weinberger’s Schwanda in Oper Graz. Since 2019 is regularly working with René Jacobs and the Freiburger Barockorchester with whom she sang Donna Anna and Agathe in Freischütz with CD recording by Harmonia Mundi.

Pastirchak is also in demand as a concert soloist, for example with Beethoven's IX. and Mahler's IV., which she sang with Ádám Fischer, Christian Arming, Henrik Nanasi and Clemens Schuldt. In 2019, she recorded Beethoven's Missa Solemnis with Harmonia Mundi, René Jacobs and the Freiburger Barockorchester. In the same year Sony recorded Shostakovich's XIV. Symphonie with Michael Sanderling and the Dresdner Philharmonie. In 2011, she sang Mozart arias with Sabine Meyer, Andreas Spering and the Basel Kammerorchester at the Gstaad Menuhin Festival, which was also recorded by Sony. In Mahler's VIII. Symphonie she sang Una Poenitentium conducted by Adam Fischer in Düsseldorf. At the occasion of Arvo Pärt's 80 birthday she sang Como Cierva Sedienta conducted by Gabor Takács-Nagy in Manchester in the presence of the composer. As soprano soloist she sang furthermore Mendelssohn's Lobgesang (Thomas Dausgaard, Swedish Chamber Orchestra), Elias (György Vashegyi, Orfeo Orchestra), Berlioz's Les Nuits d’Ete and Verdi's Requiem (Francesco Angelico, Tiroler Symphonieorchester, Sinfonia Varsovia), Strauss Vier letzte Lieder (Alejo Perez, Orchestre de la Suisse Romande), Ravel Sheherazade (Vassily Sinaisky, Hungarian National Philharmonic), Händel's Brockes Passion (Howard Arman, Capella Savaria), Bach Cantatas (Maurice Steger, Concerto Köln), Beethoven's Egmont (Nikolai Alexeev, St. Petersburg Philharmonic Orchestra).

In gala concerts she sang as a partner of Plácido Domingo, Jose Carreras, Elena Garanca, Erwin Schrott and Jose Cura. She enjoys singing operetta in festive concerts such as in the Concertgebouw Amsterdam with Marc Albrecht, in the Menuhin Festival Gstaad, in Palermo and Vicenza with Gabor Takács-Nagy, in Köln with Helmut Froschauer and in Kazan with Aleksander Sladkovsky. A significant part of her singing activity are chamber concerts and song recitals with her pianist, Jan Philip Schulze, such as in the Züricher Tonhalle, Marburger Konzertverein, Radio France, Budapest Spring Festival, Mahler Festival in Toblach, Sommets Musicaux Gstaad, Capitole Toulouse, Jewish Summer Festival, kamara.hu Festival, etc.

Opera roles and engagements (selection)

Concert repertoire and performances (selection)

Awards and recognitions 

 Simandy József National Singing Competition, Hungary, 1. prize and Tchaikovsky prize (2004)
Geneva International Music Competition, 1. prize, audience prize and special prizes(2009)
ARD International Music Competition, special prize of Walter and Charlotte Hamel Foundation (2012)
 Cross of merit (silver) of the Hungarian State (2016)
 Kammersänger of the Hungarian State Opera (2016)

Discography 

 Polina Pasztircsák: R. Strauss, D. Shostakovich, B. Bartók, Z. Kodály. Musikkollegium Winterthur, Alexander Rahbari. Montres Breguet, Ysaye Records 2010.
 Mozart Arias: Arrangements for clarinet & orchestra by Andreas N. Tarkmann. Polina Pasztircsák, soprano, Sabine Meyer clarinet, Kammerorchester Basel conducted by Andreas Spering. Sony, 2012.
 György Selmeczi: Spiritisti. Polina Pasztircsák as Colombina. Hungarian State Opera, 2017.
 Gustav Mahler: Symphonie 8. Tonhalle Düsseldorf, Adam Fischer. Deutschlandradio, 2018
 Dmitri Shostakovich: Symphonies 1–15 with Polina Pasztircsák as a soloist in Symphony No. 14. Dresden Philharmonic, Michael Sanderling. Sony, 2019.
 Ludwig van Beethoven: Missa Solemnis. Freiburger Barockorchester, René Jacobs. Harmonia Mundi, 2021.
 Carl Maria von Weber: Der Freischütz. Freiburger Barockorchester, René Jacobs. Harmonia Mundi, 2022.

References

External links 

 Official website
 Agency profile at Balmer & Dixon, Zürich

1982 births
Living people
Musicians from Budapest
Hungarian operatic sopranos
21st-century Hungarian women opera singers